In enzymology, a tryptophan-phenylpyruvate transaminase is an enzyme that catalyzes the chemical reaction

L-tryptophan + phenylpyruvate  (indol-3-yl)pyruvate + L-phenylalanine

Thus, the two substrates of this enzyme are L-tryptophan and phenylpyruvate, whereas its two products are (indol-3-yl)pyruvate and L-phenylalanine.

This enzyme belongs to the family of transferases, specifically the transaminases, which transfer nitrogenous groups.  The systematic name of this enzyme class is L-tryptophan:phenylpyruvate aminotransferase. This enzyme is also called L-tryptophan-alpha-ketoisocaproate aminotransferase.

References

 
 

EC 2.6.1
Enzymes of unknown structure